John Salisbury, O.S.B. (died 1573) was a Welsh clergyman who held high office in the pre- and post-Reformation church in England.

He was the last Abbot of Titchfield; the abbey was dissolved in December 1537. Under the provisions of the Suffragan Bishops Act 1534, he was appointed and consecrated Bishop of Thetford on 19 March 1536. Three years later, he was also appointed Dean of Norwich on 20 August 1539, but in the reign of Queen Mary I, he was deprived of the deanery in early 1554. After the accession of Queen Elizabeth I, he was restored as Dean in 1559. He was also Chancellor of Lincoln Cathedral and Archdeacon of Anglesey.

He was nominated Bishop of Sodor and Man on 27 March 1570, which was confirmed on 7 April 1570. Whilst bishop, he continued to hold the deanery of Norwich "in commendam".

He died in September 1573 and was buried in Norwich Cathedral.

References

Deans of Norwich
Anglican suffragan bishops in the Diocese of Norwich
Bishops of Sodor and Man
16th-century Church of England bishops
People associated with the Dissolution of the Monasteries
1573 deaths
Year of birth unknown
16th-century Welsh Anglican priests
Welsh Benedictines
Burials at Norwich Cathedral
Archdeacons of Anglesey